Berberis andrieuxii is a shrub in the Berberidaceae described as a species in 1838. It is endemic to the State of Oaxaca in southern Mexico.

References

andrieuxii
Plants described in 1838
Flora of Oaxaca